Manuel Alegre de Melo Duarte, GCL (born 12 May 1936) is a Portuguese poet and politician, member of the Socialist Party, and a candidate for the 2006 Portuguese presidential election. He ran again in the 2011 presidential election, this time backed by the Left Bloc and the Socialist Party. Alegre  was awarded the Camões Prize in 2017.

Background
He is the son of Francisco José de Faria e Melo Ferreira Duarte, brother of sportsman Mário Duarte, son of the 1st Baroness of a Recosta, maternal grandson of the 1st Baron of Cadoro and matrilineal great-grandson of the 1st Viscount of o Barreiro, and wife Maria Manuela Alegre. His sister Maria Teresa Alegre de Melo Duarte is also a Deputy and is the widow of another Deputy, António Jorge Moreira Portugal (1931–1994). Their son is journalist Manuel Alegre Portugal. As he once stated, his ancestors were hanged and beheaded at the Praça Nova, Porto, during the Liberal Wars.

Career
He was a member of the Portuguese Communist Party from his youth until the Soviet invasion of Czechoslovakia, which he staunchly opposed, in 1968. Today he's usually considered one of the most leftist members of the Portuguese Socialist Party. He voted against all the revisions of the Portuguese Constitution of 1976, and abstained at a commemorative vote for the 10th anniversary of the fall of Berlin Wall, in 1999.

While studying law at the University of Coimbra, Alegre was noticed for his opposition to António de Oliveira Salazar's dictatorial government - the Estado Novo regime. He was conscripted, and sent to the Azores and later to Portuguese Angola, where his involvement in an attempt to military rebellion led to his imprisonment. After serving his prison term in Luanda, he returned to Coimbra, before going into exile in 1964. As a student at the University of Coimbra he was a very active figure of the Associação Académica de Coimbra, the university's student's union, while member of the governing body, athlete and cultural agent (poetry and theatre). He would never graduate in law.

He would live the next ten years in Algiers, where he was one of the main voices of a radio station directed to Portugal, Rádio Voz da Liberdade (Freedom's Voice), also called Rádio Argel, from where he reportedly led a series of activities supporting African forces opposing the Portuguese military intervention in the Portuguese Colonial War, including by airing privileged information regarding Portuguese strategy in the theater of war. The distribution of his first books was forbidden by Salazar's government, so they circulated in samizdat form. Alegre returned to Portugal in 1974, one week after the Carnation Revolution.

He joined the Socialisty Party almost immediately, and was elected to Parliament in every election since 1975. He is currently one of the vice-presidents of Parliament, and sits in the President's advisory Council of State.

Several of his poems were made into songs, sung among others by Zeca Afonso and Adriano Correia de Oliveira, and played by Carlos Paredes. His words were set to music by Tony Haynes on world jazz ensemble Grand Union Orchestra's 1997 album, The Rhythm of Tides.

One of his poems Uma flor de verde pinho won 1976's Festival RTP da Canção, who represented Portugal in Eurovision Song Contest.

In 2004, he lost to José Sócrates a bid for the party leadership.

In 2005, a statue in his honour was erected in Coimbra.

On 24 September 2005, he announced that he would be a candidate in the 2006 Portuguese presidential election, despite his party's official support for former president Mário Soares as a candidate. On the elections held 22 January 2006, he ended up collecting 20.7% of the valid votes (the second largest amount after the elected President, Cavaco Silva, and ahead of his party's official candidate Mário Soares).

He is also a Member of the Portuguese Council of State, elected by the Assembly of the Republic.

Decorations
  Grand-Cross of the Order of Liberty, Portugal (19 May 1989)
  Grand-Cross of the Military Order of Saint James of the Sword, Portugal (20 May 2016)

Family
He was once married to Isabel Sousa Pires, born in Figueira da Foz, without issue, and is now married to Mafalda Maria de Campos Durão Ferreira, born in Lisbon, 13 December 1947, daughter of António Durão Ferreira and wife Fernanda Furtado de Antas de Campos and only sister of António Miguel de Campos Durão Ferreira (b. 21 January 1946, unmarried), and has three children:
 Francisco Durão Ferreira Alegre Duarte
 Afonso Durão Ferreira Alegre Duarte (b. 1976)
 Joana Durão Ferreira Alegre Duarte (b. 1985)

Electoral results

2006 Portuguese presidential election

Manuel Alegre finished second with 1,138,297 votes (20.74%).

2011 Portuguese presidential election

Manuel Alegre finished second with 831,838 votes (19.74%).

Bibliography
Poetry
 Praça da Canção (1965)
 O Canto e as Armas (1967)
 Um Barco para Ítaca (1971)
 Letras (1974)
 Coisa Amar, Coisas do Mar (1976)
 Nova do Achamento (1979)
 Atlântico (1981)
 Babilónia (1983)
 Chegar Aqui (1984)
 Aicha Conticha (1984)
 Obra Poética, Vol. I, O Canto e as Armas (1989)
 Obra Poética, Vol. II, Atlântico (1989)
 Rua de Baixo (1990)
 A Rosa e o Compasso (1991)
 Com que Pena (1992)
 Sonetos do Obscuro Quê (1993)
 Coimbra Nunca Vista (1995)
 Trinta Anos de Poesia (1993)
 As Naus de Verde Pinho (1996)
 Alentejo e Ninguém (1996)
 Che (1997)
 Senhora das Tempestades (1998)
 Pico (1998)
 Rouxinol do Mundo (1998)
 Obra Poética (1999)
 Livro do Português Errante (2001)
 Diálogos = Cristina Valada + Manuel Alegre (2001)

Prose
 Jornada de África (1989)
 O Homem do País Azul (1989)
 Alma (1995)
 Contra a Corrente (1997)
 A Terceira Rosa (1998)
 Uma Carga de Cavalaria (1999)
 Arte de Marear (2002)
 Cão Como Nós (2002)
 Um Velho em Arzila (2003)
 Rafael (2004)
 O Quadrado (2005)
 Tudo é, e não é (2013)

References

External links

Official site of the candidate (in Portuguese)
"Poema com h pequeno" from O Canto e as armas translated and recited in French, Catalan, Occitanian and Greek

1936 births
Living people
People from Águeda
Socialist Party (Portugal) politicians
Members of the Assembly of the Republic (Portugal)
Candidates for President of Portugal
Portuguese anti-fascists
Portuguese agnostics
20th-century Portuguese poets
Portuguese male poets
University of Coimbra alumni
21st-century Portuguese poets
20th-century male writers
21st-century male writers
Pessoa Prize winners
Grand Crosses of the Order of Liberty
Grand Crosses of the Order of Saint James of the Sword
Camões Prize winners